The Twilight Kingdom is a Big Finish Productions audio drama based on the long-running British science fiction television series Doctor Who. It is part of the "Divergent Universe" saga which continued until The Next Life.

Plot
The Eighth Doctor, C'rizz and Charley enter the lair of a suspected terrorist, but all is not what it seems...

Cast
The Doctor — Paul McGann
Charley — India Fisher
C'rizz — Conrad Westmaas
The Kro'ka — Stephen Perring
Lieutenant Fraxin — Nicholas Briggs
Commander Vayla — Anna Carus-Wilson
Lieutenant Deral — Stephen Fewell
Sub-Commander Quillian — Dale Ibbetson
Sergeant Bryn — Jeremy James
Major Koth — Michael Keating
Captain Tysus — Vivien Parry
Byzar Janto — Alan Rothwell
Corporal Orvik — Gary Russell
Tarrith Koth — Alison Sterling

External links
Big Finish Productions - The Twilight Kingdom

2004 audio plays
Eighth Doctor audio plays